Mohamed Hamad Satti (1913, Shendi – 15 March 2005) was a Sudanese physician who championed tropical medical research in Sudan to the extent that he is remembered as The father of Medical research in Sudan. Satti did not have a private clinic throughout his career and had a very philanthropic approach to medicine. He was known for being an entertaining educator who linked scientific information with stories from his fieldwork. Satti received the Shousha Prize from the World Health Organization, and the El Neelain Order, the highest award in Sudan. Dr Satti Foundation for medical research was created in his honour.

Life and career

Early life and education 
Satti was born in Shendi, Sudan, in 1913. His father passed away when he was 15. He attended the Elementary and Intermediate schools in Atbara, before joining the Old Gordon Memorial College (Secondary school) in 1927. He graduated with a Diploma of Kitchener School of Medicine (DKSM) from Kitchener School of Medicine (now Faculty of Medicine, University of Khartoum), in 1935 where he met El Tigani El Mahi.

Satti then started his medical training working as a medical officer in areas endemic to Leishmaniasis between 1936 and 1946 including Singa and Port-Sudan. He joined Stack Medical Research Laboratories in 1946, before moving to the United Kingdom and completing a postgraduate degree in internal medicine (1952–1954) where he was also the President of the Sudanese Student Society in the UK. Once he was back in Sudan, he was appointed as a Medical Zoologist, where he started with a study on a Visceral leishmaniasis outbreak, in 1956, before going to the US and completing a master's degree in Public Health at Johns Hopkins School of Hygiene and Public Health, Baltimore.

Career 
Satti was elected member of the World Health Organization Advisory Panel of parasitic diseases (1962–1980). He also became the Director of Stack Medical Research Laboratories (1963–1968), succeeding Mansour Ali Haseeb who left the position to become the first Sudanese Dean of the Faculty of Medicine, University of Khartoum.

Satti occupied several posts in the Sudanese Ministry of Health. He was an educator at the Faculty of Medicine, University of Khartoum, (1946–1948, 1963–1969) and a researcher of bacteriology, medical zoology, epidemiology, forensic medicine, and pathology. He laid the foundation of several laboratories and tropical medicine research centres in Sudan which include the National Health Laboratories, the Cancer Institute for Tropical Diseases Research, the Medical Research Council (1966), the School of Tropical Medicine (1966), the National Council for Research (1970), and the Institute of Medical Laboratory Technology. Director of the Institute of Tropical Medicine Research at the Medical Research Council, Sudan.

Once he retired in 1969, he became an advisor to the Sudanese Medical Research Association. He worked with WHO as a consultant epidemiologist and public health advisor to study the environmental effects of Lake Nasser caused by Aswan High Dam, United Arab Republic in 1970, and the Democratic Republic of Yemen in 1972. He was the Vice Chairman of the WHO Onchocerciasis Expert Committee in 1986.

Satti did not have a private clinic throughout his career. He was known for being an entertaining educator who linked scientific information with stories from his fieldwork. Satti had a very philanthropic approach to medicine as he once repurposed his private car as an ambulance.

Personal life and death 

Satti was married to Dr Fatma Hassan el Nor and with her, they had thirteen children. He passed away from natural causes on Tuesday, 15 March 2005, and was buried in Faroug Cemetery, Khartoum.

Research 

Satti carried out extensive field and laboratory work on leishmaniasis in eastern and southern Sudan, yellow fever in the Nuba Mountains and Kurmuk, Klumpke paralysis and cutaneous larva migrans in Kordofan, onchocerciasis in Bahr el Ghazal, malaria in Shendi, Hepatitis C, cholera, Leptospirosis on Nuer people, schistosomiasis in Gezira, typhoid in Western Sudan, smallpox on the Beni Halba tribe in Singa, jaundice in Al Qadarif, presbycusis in the Mabans tribe living southern Funj, filariasis in Geneina, the adverse effects of the consumption of high nitrates well water in two villages in North Kordofan, and health aspects of Rahad Irrigation Project. He presented his research at the 1st Italian Conference of Tropical Medicine in East Africa, Asmara, in 1952, and the International Congress of Tropical Medicine and Malaria (1958–1986). He left a legacy of scientific excellence that earned him the name The father of Medical research in Sudan.

Awards and honours 
Satti received the Shousha Prize from the World Health Organization in 1985, the University of Khartoum awarded him the Honorary Doctor of Science in 1980, and the Supreme Council of State in Sudan bestowed upon him the El Neelain Order, the highest award in the country in 1989. In 2011, a foundation, Dr Satti Foundation, for medical research was created in his honour.

See also 

 El-Hadi Ahmed El-Sheikh
 El-Sheikh Mahgoub Gaafar
 Mohamed El-Amin Ahmed El-Tom

References

Further reading 
Ahmed El Safi (2019-04-03). Mohamed Hamad Satti (1913-2005), The Father of Medical Research in Sudan, His life and work: Milestones in Field Research in Tropical Disease Pathology, Bacteriology and Epidemiology. Independently Published. ISBN 978-1-0964-3574-7.

University of Khartoum alumni
Sudanese scientists
1913 births
2005 deaths
Sudanese people
Sudanese physicians
Dr A.T. Shousha Foundation Prize and Fellowship laureates
Recipients of orders, decorations, and medals of Sudan